Bellamy — known as Inspector Bellamy in the U.S. — is a French murder mystery film released in 2009. It is the last film of celebrated French director Claude Chabrol (who died the following year) and the only time he worked with star Gérard Depardieu. Chabrol said in an interview that the film is like a "novel that Simenon never wrote", a kind of "Maigret on vacation".

Plot summary
Inspector Paul Bellamy (Depardieu) is a seasoned and obese Parisian police detective on vacation with his wife Françoise (Marie Bunel) at her family home in Nîmes. Their tranquil holiday is complicated when he cannot resist becoming involved in the case of a man, insurance broker Emile Leullet (Jacques Gamblin), who recently attempted to fake his own death in a car crash near Sète for his mistress (Vahina Giocante) and the insurance money. Leullet, hiding under an assumed name and altered appearance and unsure what to do now, seeks out Bellamy for help. (Bellamy is a celebrity and well known throughout France through his published memoirs, which reveal he has a "soft spot for murderers"). Leullet may or may not have killed the homeless man whose corpse was found burned in his car. The dead man, Denis Leprince (also played by Gamblin), was a son of a local judge, now also dead. Bellamy's alcoholic half-brother Jacques Lebas (Clovis Cornillac) shows up unexpectedly and soon he and Paul are bickering bitterly and Paul is back on the bottle himself, which he had previously given up. Françoise is not thrilled with all the disruptions. In between socializing with their gay dentist friend and his partner and quarreling with Jacques, Paul finds time to informally interview and repeatedly question Leullet, Leullet's wife, Leullet's mistress, Leprince's former lover, and many other local denizens. As things become more complicated, family tensions threaten to overwhelm professional obligations. Paul, a professional tough guy, finds himself pondering the meaning of his own life and relationships. Leullet turns himself in to the clueless local police chief who, apparently, has been sleeping with the mistress. He is acquitted at the trial where he is represented (at Bellamy's suggestion) by Leprince's girlfriend's lawyer who renders the defense (also at Bellamy's suggestion) in the form of a Georges Brassens song. (Brassens was a local Sète hero and had been something of an obsession for Leprince.) Jacques absconds with Paul's car and is soon reported dead in a car crash, but only after Paul has revealed to Françoise the dark secret underlying his fraught relationship with his half-brother and the source of his lifelong tristesse. The film ends with a W.H. Auden epigram: "There is always another story/There is more than meets the eye".

Cast
 Gérard Depardieu as Paul Bellamy
 Clovis Cornillac as Jacques Lebas
 Jacques Gamblin as Noël Gentil/Emile Leullet/Denis Leprince
 Marie Bunel as Françoise Bellamy
 Vahina Giocante as Nadia Sancho
 Rodolphe Pauly as l'avocat
 Adrienne Pauly as Claire Bonheur
 Marie Matheron as Madame Leullet
 Dominique Ratonnat as le médecin
 Yves Verhoeven as Alain
 Henri Cohen as le président du tribunal
 Thomas Chabrol as le type au tribunal
 Bruno Abraham-Kremer as Bernard

Reception

The review aggregator Rotten Tomatoes rates Bellamy at 88% favorable, based on 26 reviews, as of October 2014.

References

External links
  
  New York Times Movie Review By A. O. Scott A Detective Who Solves Crimes for a Living, and as a Pastime October 28, 2010 
 

2009 films
Films directed by Claude Chabrol
2000s mystery films
French detective films
2000s French films